The 2016 IBSF World Snooker Championship was an amateur snooker tournament that took place from 19 November to 29 November 2016 in Doha, Qatar. It was the 42nd edition of the IBSF World Snooker Championship and also doubled as a qualification event for the World Snooker Tour.

119 players representing 52 nations and sovereign states competed in the tournament including 2015 champion, Pankaj Advani who declined his invitation to join the professional World Snooker Tour and as such was able to compete in this year's tournament. Advani however he was defeated in the semi-finals by Welshmen Andrew Pagett. In doing so Pagett became the first player from outside the Asian confederation to reach the final since 2012. The tournament was eventually won by Iran's Soheil Vahedi, who defeated Pagett of Wales 8–1 in the final.  Vahedi became only the second Iranian player after Hossein Vafaei to win the championship and as a result, Vahedi was offered that chance to turn professional with a two-year card to play World Snooker Tour for the 2017/2018 and 2018/2019 seasons.

Results

Group Round

Group A

Group B

Group C

Group D

Group E

Group F

Group G

Group H

Group I

Group J

Group K

Group L

Group M

Group N

Group O

Group P

Group Q

Group R

Group S

Group T

Group U

Group V

Group W

Group X

Group Y

Group Z

Knockout rounds

Round 1
Best of 7 frames

Round 2
Best of 7 frames

Finals

References

2016 in snooker
Snooker amateur tournaments
Sports competitions in Doha
2016 in Qatari sport
International sports competitions hosted by Qatar
21st century in Doha